"Contagious" is a song by the Isley Brothers. It was released as a single from their 2001 album Eternal. The song was written and produced by R. Kelly, who was also featured on the song, and also features vocals by R&B singer Chanté Moore.

The video plays as a mini soap opera depicting a man who goes home and finds out his woman has been cheating on him with another man. The song is taken to another level during the breakdown of the song, where the two men, Mr. Biggs and Kelly, meet once again after their previous collaboration on Kelly's 1995 single "Down Low (Nobody Has to Know)" (although they also collaborated on Kelly Price's 1998 single "Friend of Mine"). In the middle of the second verse, Ron Isley goes down memory lane after saying "The down low happened to me all over again"; additionally, the third verse starts with Mr. Biggs asking R. Kelly "What the hell is going on between the sheets in my own home?", reprising their meeting in the Kelly Price song as well as the title of his own hit "Between the Sheets", and R. Kelly accuses Mr. Biggs (who recalls seeing him before) of mistaken identity.

"Contagious" rose to number 19 on the pop singles chart and number 3 on the R&B singles chart and made the Isleys the first group to score a hit in six consecutive decades on Billboard'''s Hot 100. The breakthrough helped their 2001 album Eternal'' go double platinum.

In 2002, the song won a Soul Train Music Award for Best R&B/Soul Single, Group, Band or Duo.

R. Kelly makes a cameo in the 2003 follow-up song "Busted" that is told from the prospective of Mr. Biggs and his current partner. In the video, he is seen returning the woman to Mr. Biggs's home before she is confronted about the affair.

Single track listing
"Contagious" (Clean Radio Edit) - 4:27
"Contagious" (Radio Edit) - 4:27
"Contagious" (LP Version) - 5:46
"Contagious" (Instrumental) - 5:46
"Contagious" (A Capella) - 5:41

Charts

Weekly charts

Year-end charts

References

2001 songs
2001 singles
The Isley Brothers songs
Song recordings produced by R. Kelly
Songs written by R. Kelly
DreamWorks Records singles
Songs about infidelity
Chanté Moore songs